Dipolyaspis is a genus of mites in the family Polyaspididae.

References

Mesostigmata
Articles created by Qbugbot